The 2022–23 Davidson Wildcats men's basketball team represented Davidson College during the 2022–23 NCAA Division I men's basketball season. The Wildcats were led by first year head coach Matt McKillop and played their home games at the John M. Belk Arena in Davidson, North Carolina as members of the Atlantic 10 Conference.

Previous season
The Wildcats finished the 2021–22 season 27–7, 15–3 in A-10 Play to win the regular season championship. They defeated Fordham and Saint Louis to advance to the championship game of the A–10 Tournament where they lost to Richmond. They received an at-large bid to the NCAA tournament as the No. 10 seed in the West Region, where they lost in the first round to Michigan State.

On June 18, 2022, the school announced that head coach Bob McKillop was retiring after 33 years at the school. His son, Matt McKillop, who had served as an assistant for 14 years, was promoted to head coach.

Offseason

Departures

Incoming transfers

Recruiting classes

2022 recruiting class

Source

Roster

Schedule and results

|-
!colspan=12 style=| Non-conference regular season

|-
!colspan=12 style=| Atlantic 10 Regular Season

 

|-
!colspan=12 style=| A-10 tournament

Source

References

Davidson
Davidson Wildcats men's basketball seasons
Davidson Wildcats men's basketball
Davidson Wildcats men's basketball